Burgeis is the largest frazione of the comune of Mals, Italy, and sits at an altitude of 1216m in Vinschgau in South Tyrol beneath the mountain Watles (2557) on the upper reaches of the Adige. The name goes all the way back to a Roman founding, as a fort on the "Via Claudia Augusta", which runs through the village.  This fort later gave the name of the Edelfreien von Burgus-Wanga, whose arms the village bears today.

Burgeis has 828 inhabitants  (March 2007) .  It lies 2.5 Kilometer from Mals.

International relations

Twin towns – Sister cities
Burgeis is twinned with:
 Lohr am Main, Germany
 Beilngries, Bayern, Germany
 Weingarten, Germany

History
The oldest account mentioning Burgeis is the Chronicle of the Benedictine Father, Goswin, who lived between 1320 and 1395 or so.  This gives a wide reaching sketch of the place, of the history of Marienberg and of Obervischgau in the high Middle Ages.  So we know more about Burgeis in the 12th century than many other, more important places.

Marienberg Abbey
Above Burgeis lies Europe's highest Benedictine abbey Marienberg (at 1340 m). Its impressive Baroque church and the Romanesque crypt (1160) belong to the most beautiful ?school of art? in Vinschgau. The Frescos in the crypt date from between 1175 and 1180.  They were partly discovered in  1887 and in 1980 completely freed.  Burgeis is the birthplace of the famous Baroque painter Johann Evangelist Holzer.

St. Stefan
The close of the Abbey contains a small church St. Stefan, which dates back to the early days of Christianity in the 5th century, according to archaeological dig, although it got its current form in the 9th and 10th centuries.

Economy
There are many Hotels, Pensions and Guesthouses (Gasthöfe) in and around Burgeis, which today form the basis of a flourishing tourism industry, especially in the winter.

Neighboring Places
St. Valentin auf der Haide, Mals, Schlinig, Schleis, Planeil, Plawenn

Literature
Hubert Walder / Helmut Stampfer: Romanische Wandmalerei im Vinschgau, 2002, 
Alfred Reichling: Orgellandschaft Südtirol, Bozen 1982, S. 11f., 60-63.

External links

Tourismusverein
Burgeis auf der Seite der Gemeinde Mals

Frazioni of South Tyrol